Kutina is a town in central Croatia, the largest settlement in the hilly region of Moslavina, in the Sisak-Moslavina County. The town proper has a population of 13,735 (2011), while the total municipal population is 22,760.

The settlement of Kutina was first mentioned in the historical records in 1256.

It is the industrial center of the region with petrochemical industry – Petrokemija d.d.,  electronic components production – SELK d.d., and a variety of smaller entrepreneurships.
There is a long mass-media tradition in Kutina, with Moslavački list [local newspaper] and Radio Moslavina [local radio station]. The initial headquarters of the Nezavisna Televizija (NeT), a regional commercial TV station, were stationed in Voloder near Kutina.

Kutina is widely known for its active youth scene and the alternative-oriented club Baraka.
The main attractions are Lonjsko polje nature park, baroque fortress church of Saint Mary of the Snow, old wooden houses called Trijem (eng. Porch) or Čardak, hills of Moslavina with ruins of medieval "burgs".

A special attraction are the Wine roads of Moslavina, where a visitor can take a sip of Croatian and regional genuine wine Škrlet (Skrlet).

The settlements in the administrative area are:

 Banova Jaruga, population 665
 Batina, population 205
 Brinjani, population 253
 Čaire, population 33
 Gojlo, population 377
 Husain, population 971
 Ilova, population 821
 Jamarica, population 410
 Janja Lipa, population 206
 Katoličke Čaire, population 232
 Kletište, population 116
 Krajiška Kutinica, population 73
 Kutina, population 13,735
 Kutinica, population 58
 Kutinska Slatina, population 578
 Međurić, population 485
 Mikleuška, population 140
 Mišinka, population 116
 Repušnica, population 1,838
 Selište, population 282
 Stupovača, population 440
 Šartovac, population 383
 Zbjegovača, population 346

History
In the late 19th and early 20th century, Kutina was a district capital in the Bjelovar-Križevci County of the Kingdom of Croatia-Slavonia.

Notable people born in Kutina
 Dubravka Ugrešić – Croatian writer, winner of 2010 Tiptree Award, 2000 Heinrich Mann Prize, and 1988 NIN Prize, among others.
 Franjo Mihalić – Yugoslav long-distance runner, Olympic silver medalist in marathon and cross country World champion
 Dane Korica – long-distance runner who competed for Yugoslavia in the 1972 Summer Olympics
 Matija Vražić Sraz - professional League of Legends flamer and feeder (bronze since 1994.)
 Marijana Petir - Croatian politician, a Member of the European Parliament

References

External links

 
 Local news and comments

Kutina
Cities and towns in Croatia
Populated places in Sisak-Moslavina County
Bjelovar-Križevci County